A figure painting is a work of fine art in any of the painting media with the primary subject being the human figure, whether clothed or nude. Figure painting may also refer to the activity of creating such a work. The human figure has been one of the constant subjects of art since the first stone age cave paintings, and has been reinterpreted in various styles throughout history.

Unlike figure drawings which are usually nudes, figure paintings are often clothed depictions which may be either historically accurate or symbolic. 
Figure painting is not synonymous with figurative art, which may depict real objects of any kind (including humans and animals).

Clothed figures

Portraiture 
A portrait painting focuses on the creation of a likeness of a particular individual or group.

Everyday life 
Genre painting portray ordinary people engaged in common activities.

Narrative paintings 
Historical paintings depict events in a narrative, which may be allegorical.

Nude figures 
The nude has been a theme in Western art since classical antiquity and again in Renaissance art, after being largely absent during the Middle Ages.

While standing nude figures of both sexes are found in antiquity, in Western art, male nudes were more prevalent through the idealisation of the male form in society. The first female reclining nudes as a popular genre appeared during the Renaissance, most notably in a work by Giorgione. Oil paint historically has been the ideal media for depicting the figure. By blending and layering paint, the surface can become more like skin. "Its slow drying time and various degrees of viscosity enable the artist to achieve rich and subtle blends of color and texture, which can suggest transformations from one human substance to another." Although working from live models is preferred, the length of time needed to complete a painting has led most modern painters to use photographs as references at least part of the time if not for the entire work.

History and styles

Notes

See also
 Depictions of nudity

References

Books

Web

External links 
Museum exhibits
 Leopold Museum, Austria – Nude Men
 Museum of Fine Arts, Boston – Degas and the Nude

Visual arts
Painting
Nude art
Visual arts genres